The National Black MBA Association (NBMBAA) is a non‐profit organization founded in 1970 at the University of Chicago, dedicated to the enhancement and development of educational and economic empowerment for African Americans. Like‐minded professionals and students are able to  share common experiences, histories, and career goals and aspirations. Dedicated to developing partnerships that result in the creation of intellectual and economic wealth within the Black community, the association is in partnership with more than 400 of the country’s top businesses and business organizations. The organization also has inroads into a range of industries as well as the public sector.

The organization gains its strength from a strong belief in community and a commitment to its development through economic and educational development. The main idea of the National Black MBA Association is for members to create a network of Black MBA holders and students seeking an MBA degree. These programs have several missions that they use as a guide line.

Programming

With 39 professional chapters, 26 collegiate chapters, and over 25 “Leaders of Tomorrow” Youth Mentor Programs, the National Black MBA Association represents thousands of professionals and students.  The association has several other programs that are developed with local and national businesses including, Candidates for Success, Case Competitions, Employment Network, Conference Job Match and Netential Scholarship.

Conference and Career Fair

The association holds an annual conference, with major personalities in the business world. At this event, The National Black MBA Association gives the opportunity for networking on a face-to-face basis. 

The National Black MBA Association Annual Conference and Exposition is intended for African-American business professionals, industry leaders, and students to gather for networking, leadership development, and professional job opportunities. Throughout the years, attendance has risen significantly with over 12,000 corporate executives, business professionals, entrepreneurs
and students expected to participate in upcoming conferences. 

NBMBAA also hosts and houses an annual Career Fair within the conferences, which houses over
400 Fortune 500 corporations to register for the two‐day Career Fair. Various venues provide a forum for discussion about education, diversity, professional development and career advancement.

External links
 National Black MBA Association official website
 The Minority Business Development Agency (MBDA)
 The National Black MBA Association - Atlanta Chapter
 The National Black MBA Association - Columbus Chapter
 The National Black MBA Association - Phoenix Chapter
 The National Black MBA Association - Metro New York Chapter 
 The National Black MBA Association - Toronto Chapter 
 The National Black MBA Association - Boston Chapter

African-American professional organizations